The Chennai Angels (TCA) is an angel investment group based in Chennai, India.

They have funded companies such as Popxo, Metroplots, Traveling Spoon, HitWicket, Brigge, Cloud Cherry, Syona Cosmetics, Velvet Case, Fourth Partner amongst others.

References

2007 establishments in Tamil Nadu
Financial services companies based in Chennai